The siege of Samarkand was the third and last campaign against the city by both belligerents. Four years after its recapture by the forces of Babur, there was a rebellion that lost the King of Ferghana his kingdom and his capital. In 1501, Babur and his army felt ready to besiege the city again. However, his invasion attempt was beaten off by Shaybani, an Uzbek tribal chief whose conquests were known across Central Asia.

References 
 Baburnama

Conflicts in 1501
1501 in India